Trapelia coarctata is a lichenised fungus in the family, Trapeliaceae.

It was first described as Lichen coarctatus in 1799 by Dawson Turner in Smith & Sowerby's, English Botany., and transferred to the genus, Trapelia by Maurice Choisy in 1932.

It has been found in mallee woodland dry sclerophyll forest, on soil and rocks, in Western Australia, and on Kangaroo Island in South Australia. It has a continuous grey thallus, containing gyrophoric acid, and is a first coloniser after fire. It was among the first lichen species to be found on Surtsey island after its inception from the sea.

References

External links
Trapelia coarctata: Occurrence data from GBIF

Lichen species
Lichens described in 1799
Lichens of Australia
Baeomycetales